The Cal State Hayward Pioneers football program represented California State University, Hayward—now known as California State University, East Bay. The Pioneers began play in the Far Western Conference (FWC) in their inaugural 1965 season. They remained a member of the conference until the school gave up football after the 1993 season. The conference was renamed to the Northern California Athletic Conference (NCAC) in 1983. The school was known as California State College at Hayward through 1971, changing to California State University, Hayward in 1972. The school was not known as Cal State East Bay until 2005. 

The program had four head coaches in its 29 seasons of existence.

Coaches

References

Cal State East Bay Pioneers

Cal State Hayward Pioneers football